Siphosenkosi Nofemele (born 12 November 1989 in Fort Beaufort, South Africa) is a South African rugby union player, currently playing with the . His regular position is winger or fullback.

Career

UFH Blues

Nofemele first played rugby at national level when he represented university side  during the 2012 Varsity Shield competition. He made six starts in the competition to help UFH finish in fourth spot in the competition. He was also named in their squad for the 2013 Varsity Shield, but was never involved in any action.

Border Bulldogs

He was one of several amateur players brought into the  provincial set-up at the start of 2014 after the professional side was declared bankrupt. He was included in their squad for the 2014 Vodacom Cup competition and made his debut in their Round Three match against Kenyan invitational side , helping the Border Bulldogs to an 18–17 win, their only victory of the competition.

He made a total of four appearances during the qualification series, but the Border Bulldogs lost all six of their matches, failing to qualify for the 2014 Currie Cup Premier Division, instead qualifying to the 2014 Currie Cup First Division. He was named in their squad for the First Division campaign, but didn't make any appearances as Border ended the competition bottom of the log with a single win all season.

References

South African rugby union players
Living people
1989 births
People from Raymond Mhlaba Local Municipality
Rugby union wings
Rugby union fullbacks
Border Bulldogs players
Rugby union players from the Eastern Cape